120 Minutes is a US television program that aired on MTV and MTV2 from 1986 to 2003.

120 Minutes or 120 Mins may also refer to:

 120 Minutes (2004 TV program), a United States television program aired on VH1 Classic and MTV Classic
 120 Minutes (British TV programme), a European television program aired on MTV Europe and MTV Two
 120 Minutes (film), the Malayalam-language title of the 2012 Indian film Yaarukku Theriyum
 "120 Mins", track from the album Thirteen by rock band Teenage Fanclub

See also
 102 Minutes, book about the twin towers during the September 11 attacks